Charlie Fowler (24 January 1902 – 22 March 1970) was an  Australian rules footballer who played with Geelong in the Victorian Football League (VFL).

Notes

External links 

1902 births
1970 deaths
Australian rules footballers from Victoria (Australia)
Geelong Football Club players
Stawell Football Club players